Jeleniów may refer to the following places in Poland:
Jeleniów, Lower Silesian Voivodeship (south-west Poland)
Jeleniów, Świętokrzyskie Voivodeship (south-central Poland)
Jeleniów, Lubusz Voivodeship (west Poland)